Semiarundinaria densiflora, the short-spiked bamboo, short-tassled bamboo, or short spikelet bamboo, is a species of bamboos.

Taxonomy
The species is sometimes placed in the monotypic genus Brachystachyum. The species has one variety, Brachystachyum densiflorum var. villosum, referred to as hairy-sheathed short-spiked bamboo in English.

References

Bambusoideae